Neopilina galatheae is a species of monoplacophoran, a superficially limpet-like marine mollusc. Its name means new Pilina (after Pilina, an extinct monoplacophoran species that lived about 400 million years ago). It lives in depths of 5000 meters and the shell is 3 centimeters in length in adults. 

The species was discovered off the Pacific coast of Costa Rica in the 1950s, where 10 specimens were collected. Later, additional specimens have been collected off the coast of Chile and off Cabo San Lucas, Baja California, Mexico. The species was the first living monoplacophoran to be discovered; previously the taxon had been considered extinct for 375 million years. Shortly after its description, the discovery of the species was described as "a zoological discovery of the first order".

References

Monoplacophora
Molluscs described in 1957